The Statute Law Revision (No. 2) Act 1890 (53 & 54 Vict c 51) is an Act of the Parliament of the United Kingdom.

This Act was partly in force in Great Britain at the end of 2010.

This Act was retained for the Republic of Ireland by section 2(2)(a) of, and Part 4 of Schedule 1 to, the Statute Law Revision Act 2007.

Section 2 - Application of repealed enactments in local courts
The words "to the court of the county palatine of Lancaster or" in this section were repealed by section 56(4) of, and Part II of Schedule 11 to, the Courts Act 1971. This section was repealed by section 32(4) of, and Part V of Schedule 5 to, the Administration of Justice Act 1977.

Section 3 - Enactments as to turnpikes to be local and personal
This section was repealed by section 1(1) of, and Part X of Schedule 1 to, the Statute Law (Repeals) Act 1981.

Schedule
The Schedule was repealed by section 1 of, and the Schedule to, the Statute Law Revision Act 1908.

See also
Statute Law Revision Act

References
Halsbury's Statutes,
The Public General Acts passed in the fifty-third and fifty-fourth years of Her Majesty Queen Victoria. HMSO. London. 1890. Pages 373 to 437.

External links
List of amendments and repeals in the Republic of Ireland from the Irish Statute Book.
  ["Note" and "Schedule" of the bill (unlike the schedule of the act as passed) gives commentary on each scheduled act, noting any earlier repeals and the reason for the new repeal]

United Kingdom Acts of Parliament 1890